State Road 170 (NM 170) is a  state highway in the US state of New Mexico. NM 170's southern terminus is at U.S. Route 64 (US 64) west of Farmington, and the northern terminus is a continuation as Colorado State Highway 140 (SH 140) at the New Mexico/ Colorado state line.

Major intersections

See also

References

170
Transportation in San Juan County, New Mexico